Helmi Järviluoma-Mäkelä (born 1960 in Ylivieska, North Ostrobothnia) is a Finnish sound, music, and cultural scholar and writer. She is a Professor of Cultural Studies at the University of Eastern Finland. As sensory and soundscape ethnographer, Järviluoma has developed the mobile method of sensobiographic walking. Her research and art spans the fields of sensory remembering, qualitative methodology (especially regarding gender), environmental cultural studies, sound art and fiction writing. Helmi Järviluoma was married to Finnish writer Matti Mäkelä (1951–2019).[in Finnish]

Early life and career

Helmi Inkeri Järviluoma was born in 1960 and went to high school in Ylivieska. She earned her Bachelor's (1982) and master's degrees (1986) from the University of Tampere in folk tradition, especially folk music, with strong emphasis on sociology. She continued to study ethnomusicology and completed her PhD in Tampere in 1997. Järviluoma had already joined the workforce of Department of Folk Tradition (later called Department of Music Anthropology) in 1986, and by 1992 she was a Research Fellow. In between, 1991-1992 she also worked as the first director of the popular music -oriented Institute of Rhythm Music in Seinäjoki. Between 1998–2005 she was attached to University of Turku as a Senior Assistant and Lecturer of ethnomusicology, working for Academy of Finland as a Postdoctoral Research Fellow (1998–2001) and Academy Research Fellow (2004–2006), finished after one year in Autumn 2005, when receiving professorship in cultural studies in University of Joensuu (later: University of Eastern Finland). In 2016, she received an Advanced Grant of approximately 1,9 million euros from the European Research Council ERC, in order to study Sensory Transformations and Transgenerational Environmental Relationships, 1950–2020 SENSOTRA in the three European cities of Ljubljana, Turku and Brighton.

From music and soundscape research towards the study of sensory transformations

Järviluoma is probably best known for her work in the field of soundscape studies. Decades of research on this topic culminated in the publication of Acoustic Environments in Change (2009) together with Simon Fraser University which sums up her four consecutive interdisciplinary, international soundscape research projects studying the changing European soundscapes.  Currently, her research focuses on sensobiographies, as well as the themes of mobilities, aging, remembering, technologies and dis-placement. Among her 180 publications, Gender and Qualitative Methods (2003/2010) continues to draw attention. She has written and directed altogether six radio features for Finnish Broadcasting Company YLE; three alone and two in co-operation with Steven Feld, and one with Noora Vikman.

Distinctions, awards 

The Finnish Union of University Professors selected Helmi Järviluoma as professor of the year 2019 in Finland
Järviluoma was selected as a member of the Finnish Academy of Science and Letters in 2018. 
In 2013 she received the Equality and Diversity Award of the University of Eastern Finland (UEF 2013) 
In the year 2006, the award Aesthetic Act of the Year, was rewarded by The Finnish Society for Aesthetics to the project One Hundred Finnish Soundscapes, which was directed to Helmi Järviluoma.

Selected works 

Järviluoma's publications include among others the results of a large interdisciplinary follow-up project, Acoustic Environments in Change (2009), and Gender and Qualitative Methods (Sage 2003/2010). She has, as well, between 2005–2017 written and directed several radio features, combining art and research, for the Finnish Broadcasting Company's Radio Atelier, and written a collection of fiction (short stories) Ja katsella hain hampaita [And to watch sharks’ teeth] in 2016. As a fiddler, she has played in bands such as Balkan music orcherstra Slobo Horo (1986—1989), women's rock band Enkelimankeli (1992-1998), and Säilyn pelimannit (2016--).

 Helmi Järviluoma: Aspects of “Dis-placement” and Ageing – a Case Study in Musical Remembering.
 Helmi Järviluoma: The Art and Science of Sensory Memory Walking. Marcel Cobussen & Vincent Meelberg & Barry Truax (eds.)</ref> The Routledge Companion to Sounding Art. London: Routledge, Taylor & Francis 2017, pp. 191–204.</ref>
 Helmi Järviluoma: Acoustic Environments in Change. Helmi Järviluoma, Heikki Uimonen, Noora Vikman, Meri Kytö & Barry Truax.
 Helmi Järviluoma: Gender and Qualitative Methods.  Written by Helmi Järviluoma, Pirkko Moisala and Anni Vilkko
 Helmi Järviluoma: Soundscape Studies and Methods. Eds. Helmi Järviluoma and Gregg Wagstaff
 Helmi Järviluoma: From Manchuria to the tradition village: on construction of place via  ‘pelimanni’ music
 Helmi Järviluoma: Local Constructions of Gender in a Finnish Pelimanni Musicians Group
 Helmi Järviluoma: Musiikki, identiteetti ja ruohonjuuritaso. Amatöörimuusikkoryhmän kategoria-työskentelyn analyysi. [Music and identity at grassroots level. Analysing on category-work of an amateur music group.]
 Helmi Järviluoma: Yearbook of Soundscape Studies,  Vol. 1 “Northern Soundscapes”, eds. R. Murray Schafer and Helmi Järviluoma
 Helmi Järviluoma: Soundscapes: Essays on Vroom and Moo. Ed. Helmi Järviluoma
 Pekka Suutari & Helmi Järviluoma: Finlandization and the Restriction of Karelian Voices at the Height of the Cold War
 Helmi Järviluoma & Noora Vikman: On Soundscape Methods and Audiovisual Sensibility. In Gorbman Claudia, John Richardson & Carol Vernallis (Eds)
 Helmi Järviluoma & Taru Leppänen : Becoming Audible! Asylum seekers, participatory action research and cultural encounters. Situating popular musics
 Helmi Järviluoma & Airi Mäki-Kulmala: Folk Music and Political Song Movements in Finland - Remarks on "Symbolic Home-coming"

News 
 Professor Helmi Järviluoma-Mäkelä receives Professor of Year Award
 In English: A jack pot! Almost 1.9 million euro grant for a researcher at the University of Eastern Finland. Karjalainen, 15 April 2016
 In English: ERC funds unprecedented amount of research in Finland, in The Finnish Union of University researchers and teachers, 1 July 2016
 In English: Does a teenager born directly to the digital world sense the environment differently from the one that was born before it? The issue is covered by a two million euro grant  in Helsingin Sanomat 2 December 2016
 In English: Helmi Järviluoma-Mäkelä: The soundscape is a tourist attraction for Finland 29 January 2017.
 In English: Generations Live inside Their Own Bubbles - Does culture move from one generation to another? in Karjalainen news paper 27 September 2018.

References 

1960 births
Living people
Finnish ethnographers
Finnish musicologists
People from Ylivieska
Academic staff of the University of Eastern Finland
University of Tampere alumni
Members of the Finnish Academy of Science and Letters